Semecarpus subpeltatus is a species of plant in the family Anacardiaceae. It is endemic to Sri Lanka. The specific epithet was originally spelt subpeltata.

References

Endemic flora of Sri Lanka
subpeltatus
Vulnerable plants
Taxonomy articles created by Polbot